The England women's cricket team toured South Africa in February 2016. The tour consisted of a three T20Is match series and a three ODIs match series. The ODI series was part of the 2014–16 ICC Women's Championship. England won both series by 2–1.

Squads

1 Katherine Brunt suffered a back injury during the second ODI match and was ruled out of the tour, missing the third ODI and the entire T20I series. She was replaced by Natasha Farrant.

Tour matches

ODI series

1st ODI

2nd ODI

3rd ODI

T20I series

1st T20I

2nd T20I

3rd T20I

References

External links 

International cricket competitions in 2015–16
2014–16 ICC Women's Championship
Women's international cricket tours of South Africa
2016 in South African cricket
2016 in women's cricket
2016 in South African women's sport
2016 in English women's cricket
S